The Pogues were an English  or Anglo-Irish Celtic punk band fronted by Shane MacGowan and others, founded in King's Cross, London in 1982, as Pogue Mahone – the anglicisation of the Irish Gaelic póg mo thóin, meaning 'kiss my arse'. The band reached international prominence in the 1980s and early 1990s, recording several hit albums and singles. MacGowan left the band in 1991 owing to drinking problems, but the band continued – first with Joe Strummer and then with Spider Stacy on vocals – before breaking up in 1996. The Pogues re-formed in late 2001, and played regularly across the UK and Ireland and on the US East Coast, until dissolving again in 2014. The group did not record any new material during this second incarnation.

Their politically-tinged music was informed by MacGowan and Stacy's punk backgrounds,
yet used traditional Irish instruments such as the tin whistle, banjo, cittern, mandolin and accordion.

Albums

Studio albums

Live albums

Compilation albums

Tributes

Videos

Singles

References

External Links
 

Discographies of British artists
Rock music group discographies